John Rhea (pronounced  ) (1753May 27, 1832) was an American soldier and politician of the early 19th century who represented Tennessee in the United States House of Representatives. Rhea County, Tennessee and Rheatown, a community and former city in Greene County, Tennessee is named for him.

Early years
Rhea was born in the parish of Langhorn, County Londonderry in the Kingdom of Ireland. His family immigrated to Pennsylvania when he was 16, settling in Philadelphia. His father, Rev. Joseph Rhea, a Presbyterian minister, moved the family to Piney Creek, Maryland in 1771. They moved again in 1778 to what is now eastern Tennessee (then in North Carolina). Rhea completed his preparatory studies in 1780, and entered Princeton College.

Career
He served in the Patriot militia that defeated a loyalist force at the Battle of Kings Mountain in October 1780.

Rhea became clerk of the Sullivan County Court in the proposed State of Franklin, and subsequently in North Carolina, from 1785 to 1790. He was a member of the North Carolina House of Commons, and served as a delegate from Sullivan County to the Fayetteville Convention that ratified the Federal Constitution in 1789. He then studied law and was admitted to bar in 1789. In 1796, he was a delegate to the constitutional convention of Tennessee and also the attorney general of Greene County. At the same time he was a member of the Tennessee House of Representatives for two years.

Rhea was elected as a Democratic-Republican to the Eighth Congress and the five succeeding Congresses, serving from March 4, 1803 until March 3, 1815. During the Tenth through the Thirteenth Congress, he was the chairman of the Committee on Post Office and Post Roads. He was a member of the Committee on Pensions and Revolutionary War Claims during the Fifteenth Congress through the Seventeenth Congress.

He was appointed United States commissioner to treat with the Choctaw Nation in 1816. Afterward, he again became a U.S. Representative, serving from March 4, 1817 until March 3, 1823 in the Fifteenth, Sixteenth, and Seventeenth Congresses. He was actively connected with higher education in Tennessee, serving as one of the founders of Blount College, which later became the University of Tennessee. He retired from active pursuits and resided on Rhea plantation near Blountville, Sullivan County, Tennessee, where he died on May 27, 1832. He was interred in Blountville Cemetery.

Rhea County, Tennessee was named in his honor.

References

External links

 

1753 births
1832 deaths
Members of the Tennessee House of Representatives
Members of the North Carolina House of Representatives
North Carolina militiamen in the American Revolution
American people of Scotch-Irish descent
Patriots in the American Revolution
Burials in Tennessee
Democratic-Republican Party members of the United States House of Representatives from Tennessee
People from Blountville, Tennessee